Union Avenue Historic District is a historic district in Saratoga Springs, New York.  It was listed on the U.S. National Register of Historic Places in 1978.

It includes at least the Congress Park portion of the Canfield Casino and Congress Park, a U.S. National Historic Landmark District.  Union Avenue, which is part of New York State Route 9P, includes a number of stately Victorian homes built in the second half of the nineteenth and early twentieth centuries, as well as buildings owned by Empire State College, some of which were once Skidmore College Buildings. Both the Saratoga Race Course and Yaddo are located on Union Avenue.

See also
National Register of Historic Places listings in Saratoga County, New York
Broadway Historic District (Saratoga Springs, New York)
Casino-Congress Park-Circular Street Historic District.
East Side Historic District (Saratoga Springs, New York)
West Side Historic District (Saratoga Springs, New York)

References

Saratoga Springs, New York
Queen Anne architecture in New York (state)
Gothic Revival architecture in New York (state)
Colonial Revival architecture in New York (state)
Historic districts in Saratoga County, New York
Historic districts on the National Register of Historic Places in New York (state)
National Register of Historic Places in Saratoga County, New York